Douglas or Doug Stone may refer to:

 Douglas M. Stone, United States Marine Corps general officer
 Douglas Maxwell Stone (born 1948), Australian geologist and author
 A. Douglas Stone, professor of physics
 Doug Stone (born 1956), American country music singer
 Doug Stone (album), 1990
 Doug Stone (voice actor) (born 1950), American actor